Green Dragon Canyon is a canyon located along the Owyhee River in southwestern Idaho, United States.

References

External links

Canyons and gorges of Idaho